The 2015 London Women's Sevens was the third edition of the London Women's Sevens, and the first tournament hosted in England to be a part of the Women's World Series. It was held over the weekend of 15–16 May 2015 at Twickenham Stadium and The Stoop in London, as the fifth event of the 2014–15 series.

Format
The teams are drawn into three pools of four teams each. Each team plays every other team in their pool once. The top two teams from each pool advance to the Cup/Plate brackets along with the top two third place teams. The rest of the teams go to the Bowl bracket.

Teams

Pool stage

Pool A

Pool B

Pool C

Knockout stage

Bowl

Plate

Cup

References

External links
Fixtures

London Sevens
London
London Women's Sevens
London Women's Sevens
London Women's Sevens